Videix is a commune in the Haute-Vienne department in the Nouvelle-Aquitaine region in south west France. The village of St. Gervais is part of the commune of Videix and a bar, known as Gibson Bar, is situated on the main through road in St. Gervais, running from Rochechouart to La Rochefaucauld.

See also
Communes of the Haute-Vienne department

References

Communes of Haute-Vienne